Sam Mizrahi is an Iranian-born Canadian real estate developer who is active in Toronto. Mizrahi is currently the president of a number of corporations, including Mizrahi Developments, Mizrahi Inc. and Mizrahi Enterprises Inc. He is best known for being the developer of The One skyscraper at the intersection of Yonge and Bloor streets in Toronto. In 2015, Toronto Life named him the 45th most influential person in Toronto.

Early life 
Mizrahi was born in Tehran in 1971 to Iranian Jewish parents, Shamoil and Ziba Mizrahi. His father was a business owner who owned and operated shops in the famous market of Tehran. The family immigrated to Canada in 1977, two years before the Iranian Revolution, when Mizrahi was six years old.

Career 
In 1992, Mizrahi formed a dry cleaning company known as Dove Cleaners. DoveCorp, as it came to be known in 2004, operated both in retail dry cleaning and commercial linen cleaning. Mizrahi listed the company on the TSX Venture Exchange in 2005 and ran it until 2007, when it filed for restructuring.

Mizrahi is the founder and President of Mizrahi Developments, a real estate developer that has developed projects in Toronto that include 133 Hazelton, 181 Davenport, 128 Hazelton and Forest Hill Jewish Centre, and 1451 Wellington in Ottawa. In 2011, Mizrahi started development of his first condominium project, a 9-story building in Toronto known as 133 Hazelton Residences. Three years later, in 2014, he made headlines when he purchased land at the southwest corner of Yonge Street and Bloor Street for development of what he called "The One", the tallest residential building in Canada.

The One (Toronto) 
Proposed as an 80-story residential skyscraper with multi-level retail at the base, "The One" will be the tallest condominium tower in Canada, according to Mizrahi. Mizrahi paid over $300 million for the land acquisition alone. The total cost for the project is reported to be $1 billion.

Mizrahi hired the London-based Foster and Partners as the design architect, and Core Architects as the local architect. He travelled to London to design the building using an exoskeleton structure. The building's design and height have gone through multiple revisions; most recently, the expensive exoskeleton structure was removed from the tower and limited to the podium of the building.

Set to replace Stollerys as the podium tenant is Toronto's new Apple Store with approxintely 19,000 square feet of ground floor retail space, superseding Apple's current store at Eaton Centre. The One's designer Foster and Partners also designed Apple's stores in Chicago, Miami, Hong Kong and Macau. According to photographer Pedro Marques, the store will feature a three-story vaulted ceiling with a cantilevered mezzanine over the main floor, a build which was complicated by Apple's requirements that there be no interior columns, and will be fronted by three-story glass panels. Manufactured in Gersthofen, Germany, each glass panel measures over 2.3 meters wide, 11.5 meters high and 10.9 centimeters thick, with eight sheets of laminated glass.

Personal life 

Mizrahi is an active supporter of Israel and a member of the UJA, and has managed and participated in the annual Walk With Israel parade in Toronto. He is also on the board of directors of the Friends of Simon Wiesenthal Center for Holocaust Studies.

References 

Iranian Jews
Mizrahi Jews
Canadian real estate businesspeople
Living people
1971 births
Canadian people of Iranian descent